RocknRollDating was a free online dating service in the United States and Canada focused around the idea that musical compatibility is important to relationship matches. The site generates revenue through advertising.

Overview 
RocknRollDating was a free niche dating website launched in 2008 and is focused around the idea that musical compatibility is an important factor in successful relationship matches. It facilitates heterosexual, same sex and polyamorous relationships. The service allows members of the site to search for matches by lifestyle interests, music genre preferences, or by specific favorite band preferences in addition to the traditional gender, age and distance criteria.

RocknRollDating allowed its members to "favorite" other members and provides a list of concerts that is searchable by zipcode.

Additionally, the site provided original content including exclusive interviews with musicians and a section called "Dates From Hell,” in which various authors give their accounts of dates gone wrong.

History 
RocknRollDating was created by Daniel House, an entrepreneur and musician best known for his contribution to the Seattle “grunge” music movement of the 1980s and '90s, when he served both as bass-player for proto-grunge band Skin Yard and President of Seattle-based independent record label C/Z Records.

In 1998, House began working at RealNetworks, where he was first exposed to the delivery of online content and web technologies in-general. After being laid off in 2001, he went back to school to complete a degree in web development. In 2003, he moved to Los Angeles where he oversaw the development and creation of the now defunct www.DownloadPunk.com, as well as the development and launch of a new website for Shout! Factory.

It was during this time that he came up with the idea for RocknRollDating, which was developed on his off-hours over the course of a year and a half. The site was officially launched on Valentine's Day 2008.

References 

Defunct websites
Online dating services of the United States
Internet properties established in 2008